Dzmitry Shchagrykovich (born 7 December 1983) is a Belarusian professional football coach and former player.

Career
On 13 November 2009, Shchagrykovich made his international debut for Belarus B team, playing the full 90 minutes in the 1–2 away loss to Saudi Arabia B team in a friendly match.

His cousin Syarhey Shchehrykovich is also a professional footballer.

Honours
MTZ-RIPO Minsk
Belarusian Cup winner: 2004–05, 2007–08

Torpedo-BelAZ Zhodino
Belarusian Cup winner: 2015–16

References

External links

1983 births
Living people
People from Salihorsk
Sportspeople from Minsk Region
Belarusian footballers
Association football midfielders
Belarus under-21 international footballers
Belarusian Premier League players
FC Shakhtyor Soligorsk players
FC BATE Borisov players
FC Partizan Minsk players
FC Belshina Bobruisk players
FC Minsk players
FC Torpedo-BelAZ Zhodino players
FC Slutsk players
FC Smolevichi players